Another Round is the fifth studio album by American R&B singer Jaheim. It was released by Atlantic Records on February 9, 2010 in the United States.

Commercial performance 
The album debuted at number three on the Billboard 200 and at number two on the Top R&B/Hip-Hop Albums chart, selling 112,000 copies in its first week. So far the album has sold 340,000 in the United States.

Singles 
"Ain't Leavin Without You" is the first single from this album. It was released to radio on October 23, 2009. It peaked at #93 on the US Billboard Hot 100 and at  #12 on the US Hot R&B/Hip-Hop Songs chart. The remix features rapper Jadakiss. The music video for the remix was released on February 5, 2010.

"Finding My Way Back" is the second single from this album, It was released on January 22, 2010. It peaked at #95 on the US Billboard Hot 100 and at #12 on the US Hot R&B/Hip-Hop Songs chart. The music video for "Finding My Way Back" was released on April 30, 2010.

Track listing

Sample credits
 "Ain't Leavin Without You" contains elements of "Help Is On the Way" as performed by The Whatnauts.
 "Impossible" contains a sample of "When a Man Loves a Woman" as performed by Percy Sledge.
 "Ain't Leavin Without You (Remix)" contains elements of "Help Is On the Way" as performed by The Whatnauts and "Name and Number" as performed by Curiosity Killed the Cat.

Charts

Weekly charts

Year-end charts

References

External links 
 

Jaheim albums
2010 albums
Atlantic Records albums